

Pre Season Friendly
Delhi Dynamos decided to go on a pre-season tour of Sweden and Denmark.
On 10 September, The Dynamos became the first Indian Super League team to play against a European top division club by playing a friendly match against BK Häcken.

Transfers

In:

Out:

Squad

Technical Staff

Indian Super League

First round

League table

Results summary

Results by round

Matches

Finals

Squad statistics

Appearances and goals

|-
|}

Goal scorers

Disciplinary record

References

Delhi Dynamos
Odisha FC seasons